Westhaven-Moonstone is a census-designated place (CDP) located in Humboldt County, California, United States. As of the 2010 census the population was 1,205, up from 1,044 at the 2000 census.

Geography

Westhaven-Moonstone is located at 41°2'22" North, 124°6'40" West (41.039522, -124.111170).

Demographics

2010
The 2010 United States Census reported that Westhaven-Moonstone had a population of 1,205. The racial makeup of Westhaven-Moonstone was 1,083 (89.9%) White, 9 (0.7%) African American, 39 (3.2%) Native American, 18 (1.5%) Asian, 0 (0.0%) Pacific Islander, 10 (0.8%) from other races, and 46 (3.8%) from two or more races. Hispanic or Latino of any race were 53 persons (4.4%).

The Census reported that 1,205 people (100% of the population) lived in households, and none (0%) lived in non-institutionalized group quarters, and none (0%) were institutionalized.

There were 548 households, out of which 128 (23.4%) had children under the age of 18 living in them, 226 (41.2%) were opposite-sex married couples living together, 50 (9.1%) had a female householder with no husband present, 34 (6.2%) had a male householder with no wife present. There were 51 (9.3%) unmarried opposite-sex partnerships, and 6 (1.1%) same-sex married couples or partnerships. 170 households (31.0%) were made up of individuals, and 38 (6.9%) had someone living alone who was 65 years of age or older. The average household size was 2.20. There were 310 families (56.6% of all households); the average family size was 2.79.

The population was spread out, with 234 people (19.4%) under the age of 18, 62 people (5.1%) aged 18 to 24, 292 people (24.2%) aged 25 to 44, 432 people (35.9%) aged 45 to 64, and 185 people (15.4%) who were 65 years of age or older. The median age was 45.6 years. For every 100 females, there were 106.0 males. For every 100 females age 18 and over, there were 107.9 males.

The homeowner vacancy rate was 0.8%; the rental vacancy rate was 3.1%. 872 people (72.4% of the population) lived in owner-occupied housing units and 333 people (27.6%) lived in rental housing units.

2000
As of the census of 2000, there were 1,044 people, 453 households, and 269 families residing in the CDP. The racial makeup of the CDP was 88.98% White, 0.00% Black or African American, 5.08% Native American, 0.86% Asian, 0.00% Pacific Islander, 0.67% from other races, and 4.41% from two or more races. 4.02% of the population were Hispanic or Latino of any race.

There were 453 households, out of which 28.3% had children under the age of 18 living with them, 46.8% were married couples living together, 9.3% had a female householder with no husband present, and 40.6% were non-families. 28.5% of all households were made up of individuals, and 5.5% had someone living alone who was 65 years of age or older. The average household size was 2.30 and the average family size was 2.80.

In the CDP, the population was spread out, with 19.7% under the age of 18, 8.0% from 18 to 24, 26.9% from 25 to 44, 35.9% from 45 to 64, and 9.4% who were 65 years of age or older. The median age was 42 years. For every 100 females, there were 101.5 males. For every 100 females age 18 and over, there were 97.2 males.

The median income for a household in the CDP was $36,000, and the median income for a family was $34,615. Males had a median income of $37,000 versus $21,964 for females. The per capita income for the CDP was $21,493. 14.1% of the population and 11.8% of families were below the poverty line. Out of the total population, 16.9% of those under the age of 18 and 0.0% of those 65 and older were living below the poverty line.

Politics

See also

References

Census-designated places in Humboldt County, California
Census-designated places in California
Populated coastal places in California